Bannen may refer to:

People
Ian Bannen (1928–1999), Scottish actor
Kelleigh Bannen, American country music singer

Places
Bannen, West Virginia, an unincorporated community in Marshall County, United States

TV Series
Bannan, a BBC Alba (UK) production TV Series (2014-) in both Gaelic & English languages.

See also
Bannon, a surname